Blues Nexus is an album by saxophonist James Spaulding which was recorded in 1993 and released on the Muse label.

Reception

The AllMusic review by Greg Turner stated "James Spaulding is a very distinctive altoist and flutist whose inside/outside playing can cover anything from bop to freer improvisations. On what was surprisingly only his third recording as a leader, Spaulding is heard at the peak of his powers, leading a quartet/quintet ... this is his definitive recording".

Track listing
 "Hipsippy Blues" (Hank Mobley) – 4:41
 "Gerkin for Perkins" (Clifford Brown) – 5:20
 "John Charles" (Ronnie Mathews) – 5:00
 "Rue Prevail" (Art Farmer) – 7:22
 "Gypsy Blue" (Tina Brooks) – 5:35
 "Vaun-Ex" (Elmo Hope) – 5:22
 "Soul Station" (Mobley) – 7:46
 "Chamber Mates" (Kenny Burrell, Paul Chambers) – 4:24
 "Bleeker Street Blues" (Freddie Redd) – 5:54
 "Public Eye" (Roy Hargrove) – 4:48

Personnel
James Spaulding – alto saxophone, flute, bass flute, piccolo
Dan Faulk – tenor saxophone, soprano saxophone
Ronnie Mathews – piano 
Ray Drummond – bass 
Louis Hayes – drums
Don Sickler – flugelhorn (track 4)

References

Muse Records albums
James Spaulding albums
1994 albums
Albums recorded at Van Gelder Studio